Fuyang West railway station is a railway station in Fuyang District, Hangzhou, Zhejiang, China. It is an intermediate stop on the Shangqiu–Hangzhou high-speed railway (Huzhou–Hangzhou section). It was opened on 22 September 2022.

See also 
 Fuyang railway station (Zhejiang)

References 

Railway stations in Zhejiang
Railway stations in China opened in 2022